Crataegus nigra, the Hungarian thorn, Hungarian hawthorn or Black hawthorn, is a black-fruited species of hawthorn native to the western balkan and the Pannonian Basin, spanning from Slovakia to Albania. The fruit, which is up to 10 mm across, can be consumed fresh or cooked.

The tree grows up to 6 metres in height. Unlike most other species of hawthorn, it grows well in areas that are periodically flooded.

See also
 List of hawthorn species with black fruit

References

External links
Plants for a Future

nigra
Flora of Europe